Guangdong Institute of Education is a provincial higher education institution based in Guangzhou, Guangdong province, China.

History 
The university was established in 1955.

References

External links 
 Guangdong Institute of Education Official Website

Teachers colleges in China
Universities and colleges in Guangzhou
Educational institutions established in 1955
1955 establishments in China